Cantina Tollo was an Italian cycling team active from 1996 until 2002.

External links
1996 team
1997 team
1998 team
1999 team
2000 team
2001 team
2002 team

Defunct cycling teams based in Italy
Cycling teams based in Italy
Cycling teams established in 1996
Cycling teams disestablished in 2002